Place Ville Marie (PVM for short) is a large office and shopping complex skyscraper in Downtown Montreal, Quebec, Canada, comprising four office buildings and an underground shopping plaza. It serves as the main and official headquarters for Royal Bank of Canada, Canada's Largest Bank. The main building, 1 Place Ville Marie (formerly Royal Bank Tower from its anchor tenant), was built in the International style in 1962 as the headquarters for the Royal Bank of Canada, which it still is presently. The complex is a nexus for Montreal's Underground City, the world's busiest, with indoor access to over 1,600 businesses, numerous subway stations, a suburban transportation terminal, and tunnels extending throughout downtown.
This beacon is not considered as a NAVAID for aviation purposes.

Buildings
The name "Place Ville Marie" is often used to refer to the cruciform building only, but it also applies to four shorter office buildings which were built around it in 1963 and 1964, and to the urban plaza which lies on top of the largest section of the shopping promenade, and between the buildings. From a postal point of view the cruciform tower is "1, Place Ville Marie" and the lesser buildings around it are "2, Place Ville Marie" and so on. The buildings and the plaza have been given many facelifts over the years. In the latest facelift, much of the grey concrete and terrazzo of the plaza was covered with grass, flowers and shrubs. The complex has  of space and parking for about 900 vehicles. There are about 70 tenants with 3,000 employees. Via Rail has its headquarters in "3, Place Ville Marie".

Site
The location of Place Ville Marie was originally a vast railway trench gouged in the flank of Mount Royal between the southern portal of Canadian National Railway's Mount Royal Tunnel and Central Station. Most of the building was thus built over the tracks, requiring the structure to be more resistant to vibrations than normally required. As a result, it is the most earthquake-resistant office tower in Montreal.

All of the land bounded by Cathcart Street, Dorchester Boulevard (now René Lévesque Boulevard), University Street (now Robert-Bourrassa Street) and Mansfield Street was owned by the CNR, Railways, with the
exception of the venerable St. James Club at the corner of Dorchester and University. Developer William Zeckendorf offered the club the top floor of the Place Ville Marie tower in exchange for their property, but was turned down.

History

Place Ville Marie was one of the first built projects of Henry N. Cobb, a founding partner of Pei Cobb Freed & Partners. His design was controversial from the start, given its proximity to many Montreal landmarks and the vast changes it would bring to the downtown core.

According to design historian Mark Pimlott, "The most radical aspect of the Place Ville Marie project was that nearly one-half of its 280,000 square metres area were beneath street level... deriving the obvious benefit of being protected from Montréal’s extreme winter and summer climate." Its vast network and multi-purpose is juxtaposed with a continuous interior "with episodes of civic gravity and monumentality".

At the time of construction, the main tower was known as the tallest skyscraper in the Commonwealth, and was the third tallest skyscraper on earth outside the United States.  The equivalent of three floors was added late in the project to ensure that this building would not be topped by the neighboring Tour CIBC which was built at the same time.

Conceived and built at a time when Montreal was the Metropolis of Canada, the structure's largest occupant and anchor tenant was the Head Office of the Royal Bank of Canada, the country's largest bank, which moved from its previous head office at 360 St Jacques in Old Montreal. The second new large corporate tenant was the Aluminum Company of Canada (ALCAN) who established in November 1962 occupying 6 floors of the building. The central plaza became an important new public space in downtown Montreal, hosting an historic election rally for Pierre Elliott Trudeau during the 1968 federal election.

Developer William Zeckendorf founded Trizec Properties in order to build Place Ville Marie.  He lost a bet to then Royal Bank President Earle McLaughlin, making payment in full (US$0.10) in an elaborate dime encased in acrylic. Exactly what the bet concerned is unknown.

In 1975 Air Canada's headquarters were at 1 Place Ville Marie.

Mayor Jean Drapeau chose the name himself.  Ville-Marie was the name of the Catholic colony founded at what is now Montreal in 1642.

From February 16–18, 2023, Place Ville Marie’s Gallery hosted the WWE Super Store (operating under the name WWE La Super Boutique due to provincial language laws), a wrestling-themed pop-up store owned by American professional wrestling promotion WWE in the days leading up to the 2023 Elimination Chamber premium live event, which was held at the nearby Bell Centre on February 18, 2023. The pop-up store sold exclusive WWE Montreal merchandise, including an exclusive WWE and Montreal Canadiens-themed T-shirt and featured opportunities for fans to sign up for meet-and-greets with wrestlers Sami Zayn, Bianca Belair, and Austin Theory.

Legacy
On 12 March 1976 Canada Post issued 'Place Ville Marie and Notre-Dame Church' designed by Jean Mercier & Pierre Mercieron. The $1 stamps are perforated 13.5 x 13 and were printed by British American Bank Note Company.

Other information

The penthouse was home to the Restaurant Club Lounge Altitude 737 restaurant and nightclub, that opened onto a rooftop terrace. The club, which was named for its elevation in feet from sea level, was one of the most famous in the city, and featured one of the most unusual dance floors, which twisted and turned around, and spanned two floors. It later became home to the 360 Observatory, which suspended its operations on 13 March 2020 and announced permanent closure on 3 May 2020.

During the holiday season, a large artificial Christmas tree is installed in the central court. The plaza has a large fountain with programmed water jets and a large abstract sculpture at its centre: "Feminine Landscape" by Gerald Gladstone.

The complex is currently owned by the Ivanhoé Cambridge, a division of the Caisse de dépôt et placement du Québec (CDP Capital), who bought the building in March 2000 for CA$450 million.

The building can be seen in the film Scanners II: The New Order in a few scenes.

Tenants

1 Place Ville-Marie
Alcoa Canada
Blake, Cassels & Graydon LLP
CIBC Wood Gundy
Desjardins Securities
Economical Insurance
Fraser Milner Casgrain LLP
Gowlings
Norton Rose Canada LLP
RBC Capital Markets
RBC Dexia
RBC Dominion Securities
RBC Wealth Management
IBM

2-3 Place Ville-Marie
EA Montreal
Via Rail
WeWork
Sekure Merchant Solutions

4 Place Ville-Marie

5 Place Ville-Marie
Cogeco
Hatch Ltd
Business Development Bank of Canada

See also
List of malls in Montreal
List of tallest buildings in Montreal
Montreal underground city malls
Royal Bank Plaza in Toronto
Tour de la Banque Royale

References

Further reading
Gray, Jeremy.  Montreal. Lonely Planet, 2004. p. 31 and p. 67.
Frommer, Arthur. Montreal and Quebec City, 2007. p. 139, 153.
McKay, Emma ed. Montreal and Quebec City. Colour guide, 2005. p. 34, 106.

External links

Official website
1 Place Ville Marie  
Place Ville Marie at Images Montreal
Place Ville Marie - Pei Cobb Freed & Partners

1962 establishments in Quebec
Air Canada
Bank buildings in Canada
Downtown Montreal
I. M. Pei buildings
International style architecture in Canada
Office buildings completed in 1962
Royal Bank of Canada
Shopping malls in Montreal
Skyscraper office buildings in Canada
Skyscrapers in Montreal